Spencer-Nairn is a British double-barrelled surname. Notable people with the surname include: 
 Douglas Spencer-Nairn (1906–1970), Scottish politician
 Tara Spencer-Nairn (born 1978), Canadian actress
 Spencer-Nairn baronets

See also
List of people with surname Spencer
Nairn (surname)

Compound surnames
English-language surnames
Surnames of English origin
Surnames of Scottish origin